Savvas Mourgos (born 16 March 1998) is a Greek professional footballer who plays as a midfielder for Super League 2 club Panserraikos.

Club career
Born in Marousi, Mourgos began his career with Panionios at the age of six, moving to the Arsenal Elite Academy in 2010 before signing for English club Arsenal in 2014. He moved to Norwich City in August 2017. He moved on loan to Dutch club Dordrecht in July 2018.

He was released by Norwich at the end of the 2019–20 season.

He signed for Veria in October 2020 on a two-year contract. He then moved to Panserraikos.

International career
Mourgos has represented Greece at under-17 youth level.

References

1998 births
Living people
Footballers from Athens
Greek footballers
Panionios F.C. players
Arsenal F.C. players
Norwich City F.C. players
FC Dordrecht players
Veria NFC players
Panserraikos F.C. players
Eerste Divisie players
Association football midfielders
Greece youth international footballers
Greek expatriate footballers
Greek expatriate sportspeople in England
Expatriate footballers in England
Greek expatriate sportspeople in the Netherlands
Expatriate footballers in the Netherlands